Vale do Rio dos Bois Microregion is a statistical region in central Goiás state, Brazil. It lies west of the state capital, Goiânia. It takes its name from the Rio dos Bois, a river that flows through the microregion.

Municipalities 
The microregion consists of the following municipalities:
Acreúna
Campestre de Goiás
Cezarina
Edealina
Edéia
Indiara
Jandaia
Palmeiras de Goiás
Palminópolis
Paraúna
São João da Paraúna
Turvelândia
Varjão

See also
List of municipalities in Goiás
Microregions of Goiás

References

Microregions of Goiás